CrystaSulf is the trade name for a chemical process used for removing hydrogen sulfide (H2S) from natural gas, synthesis gas and other gas streams in refineries and chemical plants. CrystaSulf uses a modified liquid-phase Claus reaction to convert the hydrogen sulfide (H2S) into elemental sulfur which is then removed from the process by filtration. CrystaSulf is used in the energy industry as a mid-range process to handle sulfur amounts between 0.1 and 20 tons per day.  Below 0.1 tons of sulfur per day is typically managed by H2S Scavengers and applications above 20 tons per day are typically treated with the Amine – Claus process.

Process chemistry

In the CrystaSulf process, a heavy hydrocarbon liquid is pumped through an absorber where the liquid contacts the gas stream that contains H2S. The H2S is absorbed from the gas stream and the clean gas stream then exits the absorber. The H2S  in the liquid where it reacts with sulfur dioxide (SO2) to form elemental sulfur and water according to the following chemical equation.

2 H2S + SO2 → 3 S + 2 H2O

The formed elemental sulfur remains dissolved in the hydrocarbon solution. Since the elemental sulfur remains dissolved, there are no solids, i.e., no slurry, in the absorber section of the process. This eliminates plugging problems that have been documented for aqueous redox processes when operated at high pressures. The SO2 that was present in the hydrocarbon solution was added prior to the solution being pumped into the absorber. The SO2 is chemically bound in the solution and readily available to react with H2S. The process is operated with an excess amount of SO2 in the solution so that there will always be sufficient amount for the liquid phase Claus reaction with H2S.

Elemental sulfur removal 

After the dissolved elemental sulfur is formed in the hydrocarbon solution, the liquid is piped from the absorber, through a flash vessel if necessary to lower the operating pressure, and then through a crystallizer. The crystallizer reduces the temperature of the solution and solid sulfur is formed which is removed by a filter.

After the solid sulfur is removed, the hydrocarbon solution is re-heated to approximately 150 °F and the liquid is then pumped back into the absorber to continue the process of absorbing more H2S and removing it from the gas stream. The hydrocarbon solution has a low corrosion rate.

Patent information for CrystaSulf 

6,416,729 B1; Process for removing hydrogen sulfide from gas streams which include or are supplemented with sulfur dioxide, by scrubbing with a nonaqueous sorbent; 9-Jul-2002;  David W. DeBerry, Dennis A. Dalrymple
 
6,818,194; Process for removing hydrogen sulfide from gas streams which include or are supplemented with sulfur dioxide, by scrubbing with a nonaqueous sorbent; 16-Nov-2004; David W. DeBerry, Dennis A. Dalrymple, Kevin S. Fisher
 
5,733,516; Process for removal OF hydrogen sulfide from a gas stream;  31-Mar-1998; David W. DeBerry
 
5,738,834; System for removal of hydrogen sulfide from a gas stream;  14-Apr-1998; David W. DeBerry

See also 
Acid gas
Amine treating
Claus process
Crystatech
Hydrogenation
Sour gas

References

External links
New Process for H2S Management - Bnet
CrystaSulf Information

Oil refining
Chemical processes
Acid gas control
Natural gas